Mark Armstrong  is a former association football player who represented New Zealand at international level.

Armstrong made his full All Whites debut in a 1-1 draw with Fiji on 18 February 1980 and ended his international playing career with seven A-international caps and three goals to his credit, his final cap an appearance in a 0-3 loss to Canada on 18 September that same year.

Armstrong was the first player to score 100 goals in the New Zealand National Soccer League, completing this feat during the 1989 season.

References

External links

Year of birth missing (living people)
Living people
New Zealand association footballers
New Zealand international footballers
Manurewa AFC players
20th-century births
1980 Oceania Cup players
Association football forwards